NBA Jam 2002 is a sports Game Boy Advance game made by Acclaim Entertainment as a licensed basketball simulation for the 2002-2003 NBA season. It was the follow-up to NBA Jam 2001 and was the last game in the NBA Jam series to mention a year in its title. The game was originally set for release in late November 2001 before being delayed to February 2002.

There were 29 NBA teams to play as with more than 140 players in all.

Reception

The game received "generally unfavorable reviews" according to the review aggregation website Metacritic.

Notes

References

2002 video games
NBA Jam
Game Boy Advance games
Game Boy Advance-only games
Video games developed in the United Kingdom
Acclaim Entertainment games
DC Studios games
Multiplayer and single-player video games